"Syt e tu" is a song recorded by Kosovo-Albanian rapper Capital T. It was written and produced by the rapper himself alongside Andi Decani and Rzon.

Background

Composition 
 
"Syt e tu" was written and produced by Capital T himself alongside Andi Decani and Rzon. The song was composed in  time and is performed in the key of F major in common time with a tempo of 105 beats per minute. The accompanying music video for "Syt e tu" was premiered onto the YouTube channel of Capital T on 4 August 2019. It was filmed in the coastal city of Sarandë in Southern Albania and was directed by Kosovo-Albanian director Fat Gjakova. The music video features the rapper and the guest appearance from Albanian model Françeska Jaçe.

Release history

References 

2019 singles
2019 songs
Capital T songs 
Albanian-language songs
Song recordings produced by Rzon